Tyler Gaudet (born April 4, 1993) is a Canadian professional ice hockey player who is currently under contract with Adler Mannheim of the Deutsche Eishockey Liga (DEL). He has previously played with the Arizona Coyotes in the National Hockey League (NHL).

Playing career

Amateur
As a youth, Gaudet played in the 2006 Quebec International Pee-Wee Hockey Tournament with a minor ice hockey team from Hamilton, Ontario.

Gaudet started the 2010–11 season with the Gatineau Olympiques in the Quebec Major Junior Hockey League. However, after only recording five points in 32 games, he was reassigned to the  Pembroke Lumber Kings. 

In his second year with the Pembroke Lumber Kings, Gaudet was encouraged by coach Sheldon Keefe to tryout for the Sault Ste. Marie Greyhounds of the Ontario Hockey League. Gaudet later signed a major junior hockey contract with the Greyhounds as a free agent.

On November 4, 2013, while playing with the Greyhounds, the Phoenix Coyotes signed Gaudet as an undrafted free agent to a three-year entry-level contract. After completing the 2013–14 season with the Greyhounds, Gaudet joined the Coyotes American Hockey League (AHL) affiliate, the Portland Pirates, to conclude the season.

Professional
After being cut from the Coyotes training camp, Gaudet began the 2014–15 season in the AHL. He eventually made his NHL debut on December 30, 2014, in a 4–2 loss to the Philadelphia Flyers. On January 2, 2015, Gaudet was reassigned to the Portland Pirates.

After being cut from the Coyotes training camp, Gaudet began the 2015–16 season with the Portland Pirates in the AHL. On February 9, 2016, Gaudet was recalled from the AHL. Gaudet scored his first NHL goal against Dallas Stars goaltender Antti Niemi on February 18, 2016, in a 6–3 Coyotes win.

In the 2017–18 season, on February 26, 2018, the Coyotes traded Gaudet along with John Ramage to the Nashville Predators in exchange for Pierre-Cédric Labrie and Trevor Murphy. He was assigned to AHL affiliate, the Milwaukee Admirals and played out the remainder of the campaign in adding 2 goals and 6 points in 21 games. On April 16, 2018, Gaudet agreed to a one-year, two-way contract extension to remain with the Predators.

On July 24, 2019 the Toronto Maple Leafs signed Gaudet to a one-year, two-way deal worth $700,000. He was assigned by the Maple Leafs to the AHL, joining the Toronto Marlies for the 2019–20 season. As an alternate captain, Gaudet contributed with 17 assists and 21 points in 58 games with the Marlies.

As a free agent from the Maple Leafs, Guadet opted to continue his career with the Marlies, signing a one-year AHL contract on October 16, 2020.

Entering his 9 professional season, Gaudet left North America as a free agent and signed a one-year contract in Germany with Grizzlys Wolfsburg of the DEL on August 30, 2021. In the following 2021-22 season, Gaudet contributed with 17 goals and 17 assits for 34 points through 33 games.

Continuing in the DEL, Gaudet as a free agent opted to move to fellow German club, Adler Mannheim, on May 10, 2022.

Career statistics

References

External links

1993 births
Living people
Adler Mannheim players
Arizona Coyotes players
Canadian ice hockey centres
Gatineau Olympiques players
Grizzlys Wolfsburg players
Hamilton Red Wings (OHA) players
Ice hockey people from Ontario
Milwaukee Admirals players
Portland Pirates players
Sault Ste. Marie Greyhounds players
Sportspeople from Hamilton, Ontario
Springfield Falcons players
Toronto Marlies players
Tucson Roadrunners players
Undrafted National Hockey League players